The 1974 Wimbledon Championships was a tennis tournament that took place on the outdoor grass courts at the All England Lawn Tennis and Croquet Club in Wimbledon, London, United Kingdom. The tournament was held from Monday 24 June until Saturday 6 July 1974. It was the 88th staging of the Wimbledon Championships, and the third Grand Slam tennis event of 1974. Jimmy Connors and Chris Evert won the singles titles.

Prize money
The total prize money for 1974 championships was £97,100. The winner of the men's title earned £10,000 while the women's singles champion earned £7,000.

* per team

Champions

Seniors

Men's singles

 Jimmy Connors defeated  Ken Rosewall, 6–1, 6–1, 6–4
It was Connors's 2nd career Grand Slam title, and his 1st Wimbledon title.

Women's singles

 Chris Evert defeated  Olga Morozova, 6–0, 6–4
It was Evert's 2nd career Grand Slam title, and her 1st Wimbledon title.

Men's doubles

 John Newcombe /  Tony Roche defeated  Bob Lutz /  Stan Smith, 8–6, 6–4, 6–4

Women's doubles

 Evonne Goolagong /  Peggy Michel defeated  Helen Gourlay /  Karen Krantzcke, 2–6, 6–4, 6–3

Mixed doubles

 Owen Davidson /  Billie Jean King defeated  Mark Farrell /  Lesley Charles, 6–3, 9–7

Juniors

Boys' singles

 Billy Martin defeated  Ashok Amritraj, 6–2, 6–1

Girls' singles

 Mima Jaušovec defeated  Mariana Simionescu, 7–5, 6–4

Singles seeds

Men's singles
  John Newcombe (quarterfinals, lost to Ken Rosewall)
  Ilie Năstase (fourth round, lost to Dick Stockton)
  Jimmy Connors (champion)
  Stan Smith (semifinals, lost to Ken Rosewall)
  Björn Borg (third round, lost to Ismail El Shafei)
  Jan Kodeš (quarterfinals, lost to Jimmy Connors)
  Tom Okker (fourth round, lost to Alex Metreveli)
  Arthur Ashe (third round, lost to Roscoe Tanner)
  Ken Rosewall (final, lost to Jimmy Connors)
  Alex Metreveli (quarterfinals, lost to Dick Stockton)
  Tom Gorman (fourth round, lost to Jan Kodeš)
  Manuel Orantes (fourth round, lost to Ismail El Shafei)

Women's singles
  Billie Jean King (quarterfinals, lost to Olga Morozova)
  Chris Evert (champion)
  Evonne Goolagong (quarterfinals, lost to Kerry Melville)
  Rosie Casals (fourth round, lost to Linky Boshoff)
  Virginia Wade (semifinals, lost to Olga Morozova)
  Kerry Melville (semifinals, lost to Chris Evert)
  Nancy Gunter (withdrew before the tournament began)
  Olga Morozova (final, lost to Chris Evert)

References

External links
 Official Wimbledon Championships website

 
Wimbledon Championships
Wimbledon Championships
Wimbledon Championships
Wimbledon Championships